Igor Petrovich Boldin (born February 2, 1964 in Moscow, Soviet Union) is a retired ice hockey player who played in the Soviet Hockey League.  He played for HC Spartak Moscow.  He was inducted into the Russian and Soviet Hockey Hall of Fame in 1992.

Family
Boldin's son, also named Igor (born January 16, 1995), is currently playing hockey in the Russian Minor Hockey League with MHC Spartak.

Career statistics

Regular season and playoffs

International

References

External links
 
 Russian and Soviet Hockey Hall of Fame bio

1964 births
Brynäs IF players
HC Spartak Moscow players
HPK players
Ice hockey players at the 1992 Winter Olympics
Living people
Olympic gold medalists for the Unified Team
Olympic ice hockey players of the Unified Team
Ice hockey people from Moscow
Russian ice hockey centres
Russian ice hockey coaches
St. Louis Blues draft picks
Soviet ice hockey centres
TuTo players
Olympic medalists in ice hockey
Medalists at the 1992 Winter Olympics